Acleris fuscotogata is a species of moth of the family Tortricidae. It is found in the Russian Far East (Ussuri, Siberia) and Japan.

The wingspan is 14–15 mm. The forewings are bright yellow ochreous on the basal half and reddish brown beyond. The hindwings are brownish fuscous.

The larvae feed on Quercus serrata.

References

Moths described in 1900
fuscotogata
Moths of Asia